Frank Magerman (born 9 November 1977 in Dendermonde) is a retired Belgian football midfielder and current manager of Berchem Sport.

Career
Frank made his debut in Belgian football with then First Division team SK Beveren. After relegation in 1996 and promotion in 1997, he moved to now defunct K.S.V. Waregem in Belgian Second Division in 1998. After only one year he moved on to Belgian Second Division club K.V. Oostende.

After a loan spell with Verbroedering Geel in 2001 he joined Eendracht Aalst. After a two-year spell with RS Waasland he moved to then Fourth Division club K Rupel Boom FC.

After the season 2009–2010, Frank won The Golden Shoe, a price awarded to the best player of the season, chosen by the supports.

After the relegation back to Belgian Third Division, Frank signed a contract with Second Division side Standaard Wetteren. With this club he was also relegated to Third Division.

In June 2012, Magerman signed a two-year contract with newly promoted Third Division side Berchem Sport.

Coaching career
Magerman played his last season as an active footballer at KFCO Beerschot and retired at the end of the 2013/14. He then became the manager of the club's reserve team. On 20 April 2017 the club announced, that Magerman after three seasons as manager, would leave the club at the end of the season and became the manager of KFC Duffel. On 23 December 2017 KFC Duffel announced, that Magerman had decided to resign because he didn't feel that he and the club was on the same wavelength.

In June 2018, he was appointed as manager of K.F.C. Vigor Wuitens Hamme. He was fired on 17 April 2019.

On 20 March 2019 Magerman returned to his former club, Berchem Sport, as the club's new manager.

References

1977 births
Living people
Belgian footballers
Belgium youth international footballers
Association football midfielders
K.V. Oostende players
K. Rupel Boom F.C. players
K.S.K. Beveren players
S.C. Eendracht Aalst players
Challenger Pro League players
People from Dendermonde
Footballers from East Flanders